Carl Anthony Brown (born February 11, 1970) is an American discus thrower and a one-time US national champion (2003) in the men's discus event.   Brown was born in Albion, Michigan.

Career
He attended Albion High School where he played football and basketball as well as athletics. He then spent two years at Southwestern Michigan College in Dowagiac before attending Siena Heights University in Adrian in 1993. He became the only two-time National Association of Intercollegiate Athletics (NAIA) national champion in the history of athletics at Siena Heights College, and the first athlete to win back-to-back national titles in the discus in 1994 and 1995 at the NAIA Outdoor Track & Field Championships. 

He won the 2003 USA Track and Field National Championship and was ranked 6th in the world by Track & Field News after finishing eighth at the 2003 World Championships. His lifetime best throw of 66.66 metres was the winning throw at the 2003 USA National Championships held in Palo Alto.

Personal life
Carl Brown has been married three times. His last marriage was to Marla Shaver on December 27, 2003. This marriage ended in divorce in 2008.  Brown is the father of six children. Their names are Jazmene, Jessica, Mykael, Carleigh, Malia, and Carla. He lives in Atlanta, Georgia, United States.  In 2006, Carl was diagnosed with severe Rheumatoid Arthritis and was forced to leave behind his life as a world class athlete due to numerous surgeries and rehabilitation.  He is the owner of "Xteemtraining by Carl Brown" and travels around the country as a personal trainer and motivational speaker.  His former coach was Michael Judge.

External links

1970 births
Living people
Siena Heights University alumni
American male discus throwers
Track and field athletes from Michigan
People from Albion, Michigan